The House of Yi, also called the Yi dynasty (also transcribed as the Lee dynasty), was the royal family of the Joseon dynasty and later the imperial family of the Korean Empire, descended from the Joseon founder Yi Seong-gye. All of his descendants are members of the Jeonju Yi clan.

After the Japan–Korea Treaty of 1910, in which the Empire of Japan annexed the Korean Peninsula, some members of the Jeonju Yi clan were incorporated into the Imperial House of Japan and the Japanese peerage by the Japanese government. This lasted until  1947, just before the Constitution of Japan was promulgated. The treaty was nullified in the Treaty on Basic Relations between Japan and the Republic of Korea.

With the Constitution succeeding to the Provisional Government, the descendants of the Imperial Family continue to be given preference and constitute a favored symbol in South Korea. The July 2005 funeral of Yi Ku, former head of the royal household, attracted considerable media coverage. Yi Seok also caught attention as of the 100th anniversary of Korean independence on March 1, 2019.

History

Early Era (15th century)

When Taejo of Joseon ascended to the throne in 1392, he continued to use the laws of Goryeo, and the noble titles he gave to his sons, nephews, and sons-in-law were all "prince" (군). After the coup d'état in 1398, the system of noble titles changed: "duke" for king's sons, "marquis" for royal descendants, and "earl" for officers of senior first rank. This system was abolished in 1401 to avoid "usurping" the existing title laws of the more powerful Ming dynasty.

As of 1412, Taejong of Joseon approved a new system for giving titles to the royalty: among the sons of a king, those who were born by the queen can acquire the title "grand prince" (대군), and the rest can be the "prince" (군); both princes are of senior first rank and their male descendants are as well insofar as their great-grandsons can retrieve official positions. According to the Veritable Records of the Joseon Dynasty, the title "prince" (군) was at first restricted to be given to sons or grandsons of kings, but these standards became looser over time. Generally, a royal eligible to be a prince could not receive the title automatically even if his rank raised him to the junior second rank. But such a hereditary title could be passed down to generations until it exceeds more than four generations (from the king).

Similar to male royals, female royals received titles according to their kinship to the kings. Despite all being called "princess" in English, daughters of the king and queen were called 공주 (gongju). Girls born to other consorts and fathered by the king were called 옹주  (ongju) to differentiate; some further distant female royalties also had different titles. If the above-mentioned females were stripped of titles due to various reasons, they would be referred to as a commoner; for instance, the eldest daughter of deposed Yeonsangun of Joseon was addressed as "Ku Mun-gyeong's wife" after 1506. Later, there were also so-called  "Kim Se-ryung's wife" (former Princess Hyomyeong) and "Jeong's wife" (former Princess Hwawan).

Middle Era
In 1469, Seongjong of Joseon ascended to the throne as the adopted heir to his uncle, Yejong of Joseon. As of 1475, Seongjong asked the Ming dynasty government to ratify his biological father, Crown Prince Uigyeong, to have a posthumous status as a king, and a temple name "Deokjong" was made for the late crown prince. A similar event took place in 1568, when Seonjo of Joseon succeeded the throne as the adopted heir to his half-uncle, Myeongjong of Joseon. Based on official advice, instead of giving his biological father (Prince Deokheung) a title of "king" posthumously, Seonjo created a new title for him in 1569, Deokheung Daewongun (덕흥대원군), as an honor to the late prince. This action had a precedent in 1066, when Emperor Yingzong of Song promoted his biological father (Zhao Yunrang) without posthumously elevating him to the status of emperor.

Following the precedent by Seonjo, three more royals were designated as Daewongun throughout the Joseon history: Prince Jeongwon (1623, but later promoted to "King Wonjong" as of 1634"); Yi Kwang (Jeongye Daewongun, 1849); and Prince Heungseon (1864).

In 1650, Hyojong of Joseon, as requested by the prince regent Dorgon of the Qing dynasty, adopted a fourth cousin once removed as his daughter. Unusually, he gave her title, Princess Uisun, before she was about to leave Joseon to marry Dorgon.

Gojong and Sunjong / Korean Empire (1863–1896, 1897–1910)

After the Meiji Restoration, Japan acquired Western military technology. With this power, it forced Joseon to sign the Japan–Korea Treaty of 1876 after the Ganghwa Island incident. It established a strong economic presence on the peninsula, heralding the beginning of Japanese imperial expansion in East Asia. In the 19th century tensions mounted between China and Japan, culminating in the First Sino-Japanese War; much of this war was fought on the Korean Peninsula. The Chinese defeat in the 1894 war resulted in the Treaty of Shimonoseki, which officially guaranteed Korea's independence from China. However, the treaty effectively granted Japan direct control over Korean politics.

The Joseon court, pressured by encroachment from larger powers, tried to reinforce national integrity and declared the Korean Empire in 1897. King Gojong of Korea assumed the title of Emperor in order to assert Korea's independence; he gave himself the rank of the leaders of China and Japan. In addition, Korea sought modern military technology from other foreign powers, especially Russia, in order to fend off the Japanese. Technically, 1895 marks the end of the Joseon period, as the official name of the state was changed. But the dynasty continued, although Japan intervened in its affairs. For example, the 1895 assassination of the queen consort, Queen Min, is believed to have been orchestrated by Japanese general Miura Gorō. The queen had great influence on politics during the reign of her husband, and she tried to maintain the neutrality of the country by accepting the offers from the Russian Empire, allowing the later to have greater influence. After the death of the queen, the emperor honored her by posthumously promoting her status to empress (Empress Myeongseong).

As an emperor, Gojong granted higher titles to some of his close relatives, and so did his successor Sunjong of Korea. In 1900, Gojong designated his younger son Yi Kang as Prince Imperial Ui (의친왕) and Yi Un as Prince Imperial Yeong (영친왕). Yi Seon, their older half brother who died young in 1880, was posthumously designated in 1907 as Prince Imperial Wan (완친왕). Gojong designated his (biological) elder brother Yi Jae-myeon as Prince Imperial Heung (흥친왕) in 1910.

After a long-term process of controlling the puppet state, on 22 August 1910, Japan annexed the Korean peninsula effectively ended rule by the House of Yi, forcing the nation to accede to the Japan–Korea Treaty of 1910.

The Korean nobility titles granted by Japan in 1910, listing only those from Jeonju Yi clan, are as follows:

Japanese colonial rule and Post-liberation

Emperor Gojong had nine sons, but only three princes who survived to adulthood: the second son, Crown Prince Yi Cheok; the fifth son, Yi Kang, and the seventh son, Yi Un. The Crown Prince, Yi Cheok, became Emperor Sunjong, the last monarch of the Korean Empire. Since Emperor Sunjong never had issue, his younger brother, Yi Un, the Prince Imperial Yeong became the new Imperial Crown Prince. Yi Kang (Prince Imperial Ui), might have taken the position due to his seniority but was passed over - due to the low status of Yi Kang's biological mother, Lady Chang, as well as the notorious fame of Yi Kang himself known not only domestically but also internationally. Yi Kang fathered 13 sons and 9 daughters by 14 mistresses; the number can be different based on difference sources. With an extremely wide range of historical evaluations over him — womanizer, as well as a behind-the-scene leader of the independence movement — the Japanese authorities limited the activities of the prince throughout the occupation.

Emperor Sunjong died in 1926, Crown Prince Yi Un was called "King Yi", a nominal title because the country had already lost its sovereignty to Japan. Yi Un married a Japanese princess, Princess Masako of Nashimoto, who was later known as Yi Bangja, a family member of the shinnōke (cadet branch from the Imperial House of Japan). After they married, Princess Masako gave birth to Yi Jin in 1921 (died young) and Yi Ku in 1931.

Many members of the Korean imperial family lived in Japan during colonial rule. The last princess of Korea Deokhye, was taken to Japan at a young age, she later married the Japanese count and politician Sō Takeyuki. During the Second World War, princes of the Korean imperial family served as officers of the Imperial Japanese Army. Crown Prince Yi Un achieved the rank of Lieutenant General, commanded Japanese forces in China and became a member of the Supreme War Council. Prince Yi Geon, the first son of Yi Kang, served as a cavalry officer, achieved the rank of Colonel at the end of the war and lived the remainder of his life in Japan. Prince Yi U, the second son of Yi Kang, served as a General Staff Officer with the rank of Lieutenant Colonel when he was killed in the atomic bombing of Hiroshima.

After Korea's liberation in 1945, President Syngman Rhee suppressed the imperial family, in order to prevent the restoration of the monarchy, as he feared that its return would challenge his emerging authority as the new republic's founding father. (Ironically Rhee himself was of the House of YI; Rhee's family traced its lineage back to King Taejong of Joseon, and was a 16th-generation descendant of Grand Prince Yangnyeong.) Rhee seized and nationalized most of the family's properties, and the imperial family was also blamed on being responsible for the "collapse of the nation". According to the prince's 11th son, Yi Seok, his mother, Hong Chongsun, was forced to sell noodles as a street vendor to make a living. Stripped of most of their wealth and authority, some family members fled to the United States and Latin America, known descendants reside in New Jersey and New York. For instance, Amy Lee (Yi Haegyeong), the fifth daughter of Yi Kang, migrated to the United States in 1956 and worked for 27 years as a librarian at Columbia University in New York City. In September, 2012, she was 82 years old and described as "one of the last survivors of the Korean royal court". Among Prince Yi Kang's surviving four sons and seven daughters, four lost touch with the family after they left for the United States. The other family members held an ancestral ritual twice a year for Prince Yi Kang, but usually only two or three of the 11 surviving siblings attended the ceremonies.

Meanwhile, the Jeonju Lee Royal Family Association was founded in 1957, and the members consist of the descendants of the royal family from various cadet branches of the clan. It was only in 1963 that a new president, Park Chung-hee, allowed some of the imperial family members, including Princess Deokhye, to return to Korea. However, they could only stay at Nakseon Hall, a small residence in a corner of Changdeokgung in Seoul; the place was previously reserved for widowed queen/empress dowagers. Yi Un also became the director of the Jeonju Lee Royal Family Association, on 29 July 1966; the title would later pass down to his son in 1973. Yi Un died seven years later, in 1970, after a long illness resulting from strokes.

Yi Un's son, Yi Ku, was forced by other family members to divorce his American wife, Julia Mullock, in 1982 due to her sterility (the couple, however, had an adopted daughter). In 1998, it was reported that Yi Kang's eighth son died alone in a social center in eastern Seoul. Yi Seok, as mentioned above, became a lecturer at the Jeonju University as of 2005. A series of business failures left Yi Ku out of support, and he died alone at the Grand Prince Hotel Akasaka in Tokyo on July 16, 2005. The site of the hotel had been his birthplace 74 years prior. Yi Ku had met Yi Won several times before the adoption, satisfied about his foreign language abilities, and Yi Won was therefore chosen to be his successor and the status was confirmed by the association as of 22 July 2005. Although, the adoption would be invalid by present Korean Law because Yi Ku died before the adoption process was completed.

After the death of Yi Ku, a dispute about the head of the royal family occurred. Yi Hae-won, second daughter of Yi Kang and a half-aunt of Yi Won, also made a counter-claim as the "Empress of Korea" in a private ceremony organized by her followers in a hotel room. She was enthroned as symbolic monarch of Korea on 29 September 2006 by a group called "Korean Imperial Family Association". She laid claim to the title of Empress of Korea and declared the restoration of Imperial House in her own succession ceremony in a hotel room. The private enthronement was not approved or supported by Korean politics. Yi Hae-won eventually died on 8 February 2020, aged 100.

Meanwhile, in 2005-06, Yi Seok, the 10th son of Yi Kang and a half-uncle of Yi Won, claimed that he was officially named heir apparent as [the late] Crown Princess Yi Bangja (the mother of Yi Ku and the wife of Yi Un) wrote a will, naming him as the "first successor”. As such, Yi Seok is referred as "king," "prince," and/or "last pretender" by some articles from 
mainstream media. Later, American Internet entrepreneur Andrew Lee, accepted a nomination by Yi Seok, on 6 October 2018, to become the "Crown Prince" of Korea. Currently, South Korea has no monarchist organizations that associated with the House of Yi, demanding to replace the South Korean republic with a monarchy.

House of Yi family tree

– – – – – – - The dashed lines denote the adoptions

Notes

References 

|-

 
Korean royalty
Joseon dynasty
Korean Empire